Kockroach is a 2007 novel by William Lashner, written under the name "Tyler Knox". It was published by William Morrow and Company/HarperCollins. In 2008, an Italian translation, Lo strano caso dello scarafaggio che diventò uomo, was published by Newton Compton Editori, and a Portuguese translation, Kockroach: A Metamorfose, was published by Paralelo 40°.

Synopsis
Kockroach is a re-imagining of Franz Kafka's 1915 novella the Metamorphosis: instead of having human Gregor Samsa wake up and find that he has been transformed into an enormous insect, Kockroach begins with a cockroach waking up in a hotel room in New York City in the mid-1950s, and finding that he has been transformed into a human. Since cockroaches are "awesome coping machines" which do not possess significant capacity for angst, despair, or introspection, "Jerry Blatta" (as he becomes known) quickly learns to walk on two legs instead of six, to recognize himself in a mirror, to dress and feed himself, to ward off predators by constantly showing his teeth, to play chess, and, Chauncey Gardiner-like, to fake his way through conversations. From there, he becomes a mob enforcer, then a mob boss, before venturing into politics.

Reception
Mark Lindquist described Kockroach as "Damon Runyon meets Kafka," while the San Francisco Chronicle compared it to Dashiell Hammett's Red Harvest.

Kit Reed praised Lashner (as Knox)'s portrayal of the transformed cockroach, but criticized him for having anachronisms in the setting, saying that "(p)eriod details tend to slide around as though the author has done his homework, just not quite enough of it."

Potential sequel
Lashner has said that if he were to write a sequel, it would be modeled on Robert Caro's Master of the Senate.

References

External links
Official site

2007 American novels
Fictional cockroaches
Adaptations of works by Franz Kafka
Works published under a pseudonym